Guillaume de Van (2 July 1906 in Memphis – 2 July 1949 in Amalfi) real name William Carrolle Devan, was a French musicologist and choral conductor of American origin. A student at Princeton University, he then traveled to Rome to train in Gregorian chant. In the early 1930s, he became choir conductor, conducting the Armenian choir in Paris. In 1935, in collaboration with abbot Ducaud-Bourget, he founded the vocal ensemble Les Paraphonistes de Saint-Jean des Matines. With this ensemble he interpreted and recorded for the first time several secular and religious vocal works of the Middle Ages. Among these works, he recorded the world premiere of Messe de Nostre Dame by Guillaume de Machaut in 1936 of which he made one of the first complete transcriptions published by the Corpus mensurabilis musicae in 1950. In 1942 he was appointed by the Vichy regime curator of the newly created , until 1944. After the Liberation of France, he was suspended from his duties on 24 August 1944.

Bibliography 
 Sara Iglesias, Musicologie et Occupation : Science, musique et politique dans la France des « années noires », chapter Un personnage-clé : Guillaume de Van, nouveau prince et « usurpateur » de la musicologie française. 2014 éditions MSH.

References

External links 
 Guillaume de Van on musicme.com
 Guillaume de Van on Discogs

20th-century French musicians
20th-century French musicologists
People from Memphis, Tennessee
1906 births
1949 deaths
American emigrants to France